Gymnopilus edulis is a species of mushroom in the family Hymenogastraceae.  It was given its current name by American mycologist Murrill in 1917.

See also
List of Gymnopilus species

References

External links
Gymnopilus edulis at Index Fungorum

edulis
Taxa named by Charles Horton Peck